Kazimierz Nikin is a Polish sprint canoeist who competed in the mid-1970s. He won a bronze medal in the K-1 10000 m event at the 1975 ICF Canoe Sprint World Championships in Belgrade.

References

Living people
Polish male canoeists
Year of birth missing (living people)
Place of birth missing (living people)
ICF Canoe Sprint World Championships medalists in kayak